Muhammad Arshad may refer to:
Muhammad Arshad (writer) (fl. 16th century), 16th-century Persian-language writer of Bengal
Muhammad Arshad (kabaddi) (born 1979), Pakistani kabaddi player
Muhammad Arshad (footballer), member of the Pakistan national football team in the 2002 FIFA World Cup qualification (AFC) tournament
Muhammad Arshad (field hockey), player for Pakistan in the 2007 Men's Hockey Asia Cup